Ryanodine receptor 3 is one of a class of ryanodine receptors and a protein that in humans is encoded by the RYR3 gene.  The protein encoded by this gene is both a calcium channel and a receptor for the plant alkaloid ryanodine.  RYR3 and RYR1 control the resting calcium ion concentration in skeletal muscle.

See also
Ryanodine receptor

References

Further reading

External links 
 

Ion channels
EF-hand-containing proteins